The spotted handfish (Brachionichthys hirsutus) is a rare Australian fish in the handfish family, Brachionichthyidae, classified as critically endangered on the IUCN Red List 2020. It has a highly restricted range, being found only in the estuary of Derwent River, Tasmania, and nearby areas, with the main threat to its existence being an invasive species, the Northern Pacific seastar (Asterias amurensis).

The spotted handfish is an unusual fish, in that it has highly adapted pectoral fins, which appear like hands (hence the name) and allow it to walk on the sea floor.

Description
The spotted handfish is a rare species in the handfish family, Brachionichthyidae.

The handfishes are a unique, Australian family of anglerfish, the most speciose of the few marine fish families endemic to Australia. Their pectoral fins are leg-like with extremities resemblant of a sort-of hand (hence their common name).

Habitat

It chooses habitats based on the microhabitat features.  It tends to prefer complex habitats with features such as depressions and ripple formations filled with shells to avoid predators.

Reproduction

The species spawns sometime during September and October. Females lay a number of eggs varying from 80 to 250 eggs on a variety of vertical objects, including sea grasses, sponges, macrophytic algae, polychaete worm tubes, and stalked ascidians. The eggs are large in diameter measuring approximately 3–4 mm.  Handfish have a short pelagic larval period; their eggs hatch after 7–8 weeks as fully formed juveniles (6–7 mm SL).

Diet
Little is known regarding their diet, but they have been reported to prey on small shellfish, shrimp, and polychaete worms in the wild. When captive in aquaria, spotted handfish eat mysid shrimp, amphipods, and small live fish. Newly hatched handfish have been observed to do quite well on a diet of small amphipods.

Conservation 

In 1996, the spotted handfish was the first marine fish to be listed as critically endangered in the IUCN Red List, and is still classified as such (last assessed 2018). It has the same classification under Australia's Environment Protection and Biodiversity Conservation Act 1999 (EPBC Act), and as Endangered under Tasmania's Threatened Species Protection Act 1995.  All handfish species are protected under the Tasmanian Living Marine Resources Management Act 1995, which prohibits their collection in State waters without a permit.

The most urgent matter concerning the survival of the species is to address the threat posed by the presence of an introduced species of seastar, the Northern Pacific seastar (Asterias amurensis), which prey on not only the fish eggs, but also on the sea squirts (ascidians) that help to form the substrate that the fish spawn on. Since the seastar, native to Japanese waters, was established in the Derwent River and estuary in the 1980s, efforts have been made to control its spread in Australia.

References

General source

External links

 
  (1999)

spotted handfish
Endemic fauna of Tasmania
spotted handfish